Simon Asmar (Arabic سيمون أسمر: Born in Ghazir, January 2, 1943 - September 11, 2019) was a Lebanese television director and producer, and the creator of Studio al-Fan (Art Studio), the famous and one of the Arab world's first star-maker talent show in Lebanon, that is behind most famous Lebanese stars like Majida El Roumi, Ragheb Alama, Nawal El Zoghbi, Wael Kfoury and Assi El Hellani. Thus he was nicknamed the "Star-maker" (صانع النجوم). Asmar also produced several popular game shows, including Bab al-Haz (Gate of Luck), Laylet Haz (A Lucky Night) and Ahla bi Hal Tali (You're Welcome). He was also founded the River Arts (نهر الفنون), a theatre-style river-side restaurant and cafe with a large gathering his famous artists with their orchestras, and a destination for Arab and international tourists.

Biography

Early life 
Born in 1943 in Ghazir, he studied many disciplines in Paris including arts and sound engineering in 1960, then studied the arts of preparing and directing television programs in 1968, as well as preparing and presenting artists.

Education 

 1955 studied Arts and Electronics
 1960 studied Sound Engineering
 1961 studied the preparation of artists
 1968 studied editing and directing programs

Career 
Simon Asmar started his career in Tele Liban when his talents were discovered by producers which granted him the opportunity to work before he finishes his studies.

In 1972, his program, Studio El Fan, for Talents, was launched, the first of its kind in the Arab world. Since then, he has worked as a producer and director for hundreds of artistic, entertainment, political and cultural shows, in addition to competition and other programs in the Lebanese Broadcasting Corporation, where he became the director of its variety programs department, responsible for public relations, and a member of the board of directors of its programs. He worked in similar positions in Lebanon TV, before moving to MTV, where he worked until he died.

Simon Asmar was the owner and initiator of the idea of the River Arts (نهر الفنون), a theatre-style river-side restaurant and cafe with a large gathering of mainly his famous artists with their orchestras, and a destination for Arab and international tourists. The restaurant caught fire in 2006, for unknown reasons.

He was also the chairman of Studio El Fan, as well as the consultant and partner of Marwan Abu Al-Ghanem's Melody Art Production Company in Dubai.

Simon received more than 20 awards in Lebanon and internationally, including Best Television Creator in 1994, and the Sydney Key Award in Australia the same year, and the Encyclopedia of the International Year Award in 1997,  and in 2003, on the occasion of the 44th anniversary of his services in the field of art, he was honored by the two immortal committees of giants of the East and Friends of Simon Asmar.

As for the total of his work in the audiovisual field, it exceeds 100 programs. Among the most prominent stars that he made were: Abdo Yaghi, Majida Al-Roumi, Walid Tawfiq, Ghassan Saliba, Rabih Al-Khouli, Ragheb Alama, Mary Suleiman, Assi Al- Hillani, Nawal Al-Zoghbi, Wael Kfoury, Elissa, Fares Karam, Rami Ayyash  Myriam Fares and Zain Al Omr, as for the media, Nidal al-Ahmadiyya,  Liliane Andraos and Abdul-Ghani Tleis; In poetry, Rudi Rahmeh; In music Jean-Marie Riachi, and Nicola Saadeh Nakhla, who succeeded in the art studio in the category of playing the oud.

In 2014, Asmar presented a program to launch talents under the name "Sawtak Chaghleh" (صوتك شغلة) with the singer Amir Yazbek, but he seemed not in his place and did not ownall the rules of the game.

After that, he participated in the last two seasons of " Celebrity Duets ",

He was member of the jury in the last two seasons of MTV's Celebrity Duets when he died, when his looks and offensive comments to the participants were criticized.

Marital status 
He married Nada Kreidi on February 10, 1977, and they have three children: Wasim, Karim, and Bashir.

Imprisonment 
Asmar was arrested in 2013 for the alleged murder of a Syrian national Mohammad Ragheb al-Darwish.

The case began in 2013 when a young man who worked for Asmar in one of his restaurants was found murdered, so he was called for interrogation. It was found that the young man was blackmailing him with large sums of money, after they have engaged in a sexual relationship. Investigations proved that he had nothing to do with the crime, but the security forces kept him detained after finding reports against him of checks without balance of huge amounts of money, he was imprisoned for ten months. A picture of him  sleeping in prison was leaked, which angered his family, he went through a health crisis, and was transferred to the hospital. It is said that his health has deteriorated since entering the prison, andhe sold his house, which worth 6 million dollars, a businessman helped bail him out of jail.

Death 
He was suffering from urinary tract health problems, prostate cancer, and complications affecting the kidneys, as he underwent a kidney transplant operation that necessitated his stay in the hospital to receive the necessary medical attention. He died on September 11, 2019, at the age of 76, after a struggle with kidney disease.

See also 

 Studio El Fan
 Lebanese Broadcasting Corporation
 Télé Liban
 Majida El Roumi
 Ragheb Alama
 Nawal El Zoghbi
 Wael Kfoury

References 

1943 births
2019 deaths
20th-century Lebanese people
Lebanese television producers
Lebanese television directors